In mathematics, an integrodifference equation is a recurrence relation on a function space, of the following form:

Note that in the definition above,  can be vector valued, in which case each element of  has a scalar valued integrodifference equation associated with it. Integrodifference equations are widely used in mathematical biology, especially theoretical ecology, to model the dispersal and growth of populations. Integrodifference equations are most commonly used to describe univoltine populations, including, but not limited to, many arthropod, and annual plant species. However, multivoltine populations can also be modeled with integrodifference equations, as long as the organism has non-overlapping generations. In this case,  is not measured in years, but rather the time increment between broods.

Convolution kernels and invasion speeds
In one spatial dimension, the dispersal kernel often depends only on the distance between the source and the destination, and can be 
In this case, some natural conditions on f and k imply that there is a well-defined
spreading speed for waves of invasion generated from compact initial conditions.  The wave speed is often calculated
by studying the linearized equation

where .
This can be written as the convolution

Using a moment-generating-function transformation

it has been shown that the critical wave speed

Other types of equations used to model population dynamics through space include reaction–diffusion equations and metapopulation equations. However, diffusion equations do not as easily allow for the inclusion of explicit dispersal patterns and are only biologically accurate for populations with overlapping generations. Metapopulation equations are different from integrodifference equations in the fact that they break the population down into discrete patches rather than a continuous landscape.

References

 

Mathematical and theoretical biology
Recurrence relations